Bearden School District 53 is a public school district based in Bearden, Arkansas, United States.

The school district encompasses  of land in Ouachita, Dallas, and Calhoun counties.

Within Ouachita County it includes Bearden. Within Calhoun County it serves Thornton.

History
On July 1, 1985, the Thornton School District consolidated into the Bearden district.

Schools 
 Bearden Elementary School, serving kindergarten through grade 6.
 Bearden High School, serving grades 7 through 12.

References

Further reading
Maps indicating predecessor school districts:
 (Download)
 (Download)

External links

 

Education in Ouachita County, Arkansas
Education in Dallas County, Arkansas
Education in Calhoun County, Arkansas
School districts in Arkansas